Provincial by-elections were held in Quebec on 12 May 2008 to fill three vacancies in the National Assembly. The by-elections were called on 9 April 2008.

All three seats were held by their incumbent parties.

Bourget

The district of Bourget was vacated by Parti Québécois MNA Diane Lemieux on 17 October 2007. Federal Bloc Québécois MP Maka Kotto resigned from the House of Commons of Canada to contest the by-election, which in turn resulted in the federal Saint-Lambert by-election of September 8, 2008.

 
|Liberal Party
|Lyn Thériault
|align="right"|5161
|align="right"|31.92
|align="right"|+9.07

Hull
The riding of Hull was vacated by Liberal MNA Roch Cholette on 9 April 2008.

 
|Liberal Party
|Maryse Gaudreault
|align="right"|7403
|align="right"|45.21
|align="right"|+2.68

Pointe-aux-Trembles
Pointe-aux-Trembles was vacated by PQ MNA André Boisclair on 15 November 2007. The by-election was won by Nicole Léger, Boisclair's predecessor as MNA for the riding.

 
|Liberal Party
|Mélissa Dumais
|align="right"|2987
|align="right"|21.84
|align="right"|+3.60

|Independent
|Gérald Briand
|align="right"|78
|align="right"|0.57
|align="right"|–

|Independent
|Régent Millette
|align="right"|31
|align="right"|0.23
|align="right"|–

References

2008 elections in Canada
Elections in Quebec
Provincial by-elections in Quebec
2008 in Quebec